Ilse Werner (born Ilse Charlotte Still, 11 July 1921 – 8 August 2005) was a Dutch-German actress, singer, and musical whistler.

Life
She was born in Batavia (present-day Jakarta, Indonesia) to a Dutch father, merchant and plantation owner, and a German mother. Werner was Dutch by birth; although she lived most of her life and spent her career with great successes in Austria and Germany, mainly during the time of the Third Reich. She did not assume German citizenship until 1955.

Arriving in Frankfurt, Germany at the age of 10, Werner's family in 1934 moved to Vienna, where she attended the Max Reinhardt Seminar drama school and gave her debut at the Theater in der Josefstadt in 1937. She later made her name at the legendary UFA Studios near Berlin. She starred in popular wartime films including Die schwedische Nachtigall ("The Swedish Nightingale"), Wir machen Musik ("We're Making Music"), the musical drama Große Freiheit Nr. 7 and Münchhausen. She was the hostess of a popular television show of Fernsehsender Paul Nipkow from 1941, titled "Wir senden Frohsinn - Wir spenden Freude". 

Having briefly been barred from performing by the Allies at the end of World War II, due to her alleged role in Nazi propaganda, she returned to the big screen in the 1950s where she excelled in dramatic character roles. She also acted in theatre, worked as a dubbing actor, and recorded numerous songs and whistling performances.

Werner had her last appearance on German TV in 2001. She later lived in a retirement home in Lübeck, where she died peacefully in her sleep on 7 August 2005, having suffered from pneumonia. Her last wish was to have her ashes scattered in Potsdam-Babelsberg, near the film studios.

Selected filmography 
  (1938)
 Das Leben kann so schön sein (1938)
 Frau Sixta (1938)
 Bel Ami (1939)
  Three Fathers for Anna (1939)
 Her First Experience (1939)
 Bal pare (1940)
 Wunschkonzert (1940)
 The Swedish Nightingale (1941)
 We Make Music (1942)
 Wedding in Barenhof (1942)
 Münchhausen (1943)
 Große Freiheit Nr. 7 (1944)
 Tell the Truth (1946)
 Mysterious Shadows (1949)
 The Orplid Mystery (1950)
 The Disturbed Wedding Night (1950)
 Queen of the Night (1951)
  (1951)
 The Bird Seller (1953)
 Annie from Tharau (1954)
 Reaching for the Stars (1955)
 The Mistress of Solderhof (1956)
 Rivalen der Rennbahn (TV series, 1989)
  (1990)

Dubbing 
After the war, she became an active voice dubber, dubbing foreign films in German.
 1948 - Gene Tierney in Laura (1944)
 1949 - Margaret Lindsay in The Spoilers (1942) - (Die Freibeuterin)
 1949 - Gale Sondergaard in The Mark of Zorro (1940) - (Im Zeichen des Zorro)
 1950 - Olivia de Havilland in The Adventures of Robin Hood (1938) - (Robin Hood, König der Vagabunden)
 1950 - Maureen O'Hara in The Black Swan (1942) - (Der Seeräuber)
 1950 - Paulette Goddard in Reap the Wild Wind (1942) - (Piraten im Karibischen Meer)
 1950 - Rita Hayworth in My Gal Sal (1942) - (Die Königin vom Broadway)
 1950 - Maureen O'Hara in Buffalo Bill (1944) - (Buffalo Bill, der weiße Indianer)
 1950 - Linden Travers in Christopher Columbus (1949)
 1952 - Gale Storm in The Texas Rangers (1951) - (Grenzpolizei in Texas)

Further reading 
 1941 Ich über mich. Berlin: Kranich-Verlag, 1943 (autobiography)
 1981 So wird’s nicht wieder sein. Ein Leben mit Pfiff; Ullstein-TB, 1996;  (autobiography)
 Marion Schröder et al.; Ilse Werner; Bildband 2001; 
 Rüdiger Bloemeke La Paloma - Das Jahrhundert-Lied, Hamburg 2005,

External links
 
 BBC News article about her death
 Filmportal: Filmografie
 Photographs of Ilse Werner

1921 births
2005 deaths
People from Batavia, Dutch East Indies
Dutch emigrants to Germany
German film actresses
Dutch film actresses
Schlager musicians
Whistlers
German voice actresses
German television actresses
20th-century German actresses
Officers Crosses of the Order of Merit of the Federal Republic of Germany
Best Actress German Film Award winners
Dutch people of the Dutch East Indies
Deaths from pneumonia in Germany